Paulo César Arruda Parente (born 26 August 1978 in Osasco, São Paulo), known as Paulo César, is a former Brazilian footballer and former manager of Juventude. He is currently the assistant coach of Paris Saint-Germain Women's Under-19.

Career
He has previously played for Nacional-SP, Flamengo, Fluminense FC, EC Vitória, Botafogo, Vasco da Gama, Santos FC and Paris St-Germain.

On 24 January 2007 he made his Toulouse Ligue 1 debut against Nice and on 26 August 2009 the Brazilian midfielder of Toulouse FC, had announced his transfer to Fluminense FC, the footballer has signed a contract for one season with Tricolor carioca. On 12 January 2010, Fluminense released the midfielder at his request. On 25 February 2010 Grêmio Recreativo Barueri signed the former Fluminense right-back until the end of the season. On 11 January 2011, the ex-national team player set to move to São Caetano from Barueri.

Heritage
In 2008 Cesár was made an Italian citizen in Potenza Picena, Province of Macerata, in the Italian region of Marche, thanks to his wife's Italian heritage. The interesting fact to this, is that also the footballers Mauro Camoranesi and Cicinho also have immediate family hailing from this village of 15,000 people.

Honours
Paris Saint-Germain
Coupe de France: 2005–06

References

1978 births
Living people
People from Osasco
Brazilian footballers
Brazilian football managers
Brazil international footballers
Brazil under-20 international footballers
Brazilian people of Italian descent
Brazilian expatriate footballers
Expatriate footballers in France
Association football defenders
Campeonato Brasileiro Série A players
Ligue 1 players
Nacional Atlético Clube (SP) players
CR Flamengo footballers
Fluminense FC players
Esporte Clube Vitória players
CR Vasco da Gama players
Botafogo de Futebol e Regatas players
Paris Saint-Germain F.C. players
Santos FC players
Toulouse FC players
Grêmio Barueri Futebol players
Associação Desportiva São Caetano players
Vila Nova Futebol Clube players
Grêmio Osasco Audax Esporte Clube players
Clube Atlético Taboão da Serra players
Esporte Clube Juventude managers
Footballers from São Paulo (state)